Dictyoptera aurora, known generally as the golden net-wing or red net-winged beetle, is a species of net-winged beetle in the family Lycidae. It is found in North America, Siberia and Europe.

References

Further reading

External links

 

Lycidae
Articles created by Qbugbot
Beetles described in 1784